Nor Gyugh (also Romanized as Nor Gyukh; formerly, Tazagyukh) is a town in the Kotayk Province of Armenia.  'Nor Gyugh' translates as 'New Village' in English. The village is mainly populated by Armenians but has a Kurdish minority (including Yazidis).

See also 
Kotayk Province

References 

World Gazeteer: Armenia – World-Gazetteer.com

Populated places in Kotayk Province
Kurdish settlements in Armenia
Yazidi populated places in Armenia